is a crossover fighting game developed and published by Capcom. It is the third installment in the Marvel vs. Capcom series, which features characters from Capcom's video game franchises and characters from Marvel Comics. The game debuted in Japanese and North American arcades in 1998. It was ported to the Dreamcast in 1999 and the PlayStation in 2000. The game was re-released in 2012 for the PlayStation 3 and Xbox 360 as part of the Marvel vs. Capcom Origins collection.

Players select a team of characters from the Marvel and Capcom universes to engage in combat and attempt to knock out their opponents. Unlike the series' previous entry, Marvel Super Heroes vs. Street Fighter, the game features characters from numerous Capcom video game franchises, rather than strictly Street Fighter characters. While the gameplay is largely identical to its predecessor, Clash of Super Heroes features two distinct changes: the removal of the traditional character assist system and the introduction of the "Variable Cross" attack.

The Dreamcast version of the game was praised for its visuals, gameplay, and translation of the original arcade experience. For the PlayStation version, Capcom removed tag team battles due to the console's limited RAM capacity in an attempt to preserve the main game's speed and graphical integrity. Consequently, the PlayStation port received slightly less positive reviews than the Dreamcast version. A sequel, Marvel vs. Capcom 2: New Age of Heroes, was released in 2000.

Gameplay

Marvel vs. Capcom: Clash of Super Heroes is the third entry in the Marvel vs. Capcom series of 2D fighting games. The game utilizes similar tag team-based game mechanics to its predecessor, Marvel Super Heroes vs. Street Fighter. Before starting each match, the player selects a team of two fighters to compete in one-on-one combat. The player is free to swap between their characters at any point during battle. While one character fights, their teammate resting off-screen slowly regenerates their life gauge. The first team to exhaust their opponent's vitality wins the match; however, if the timer runs out before either team is knocked out, the player with the most remaining health is declared the winner.

Clash of Super Heroes features two significant gameplay changes from Marvel Super Heroes vs. Street Fighter. The game removes the "Variable Assist" feature used in the previous installment, which allows the player to summon their offscreen teammate to perform a special attack, in favor of the "Guest Character/Special Partner" system. While similar in function, guest characters are randomly allocated to each player at the beginning of a match. They are also limited to a few uses per round. Clash of Super Heroes introduces a new technique called the "Variable Cross", also known as a "Duo Team Attack". When executing a Variable Cross, the player can attack their opponent with both characters simultaneously for a limited time. In addition, the player is given unlimited use of the "Hyper Combo Gauge", a colored meter towards the bottom of the screen which allows the player to perform several special techniques, allowing them to pull off multiple Hyper Combo moves, which deliver heavy damage to the opponent, in quick succession.

Modes
The Dreamcast version of Marvel vs. Capcom: Clash of Super Heroes includes five game modes: Arcade, Versus, Training, Survival, and Cross Fever. In Arcade Mode, the player must defeat several artificial intelligence-controlled teams to reach the final boss character, Onslaught, a character from the X-Men comic book series. Upon completion, the player views a cinematic ending unique to each playable fighter. In Versus Mode, two players can choose their characters, handicap level, and stages before competing against each other in battle locally. The player can practice moves and combos in Training Mode, where they can also adjust certain settings, such as AI difficulty, and the number of bars available in the Hyper Combo Gauge. In Survival Mode, the player fights through waves of enemies with a time limit; in addition, the player's life gauge is carried over through each round. Cross Fever Mode allows four players to simultaneously compete in a two-on-two match. In place of Cross Fever, the PlayStation version features an exclusive mode called Cross Over. Cross Over is the only mode in the PlayStation port that permits tag team gameplay, which was removed due to the console's limited RAM capacity.

Playable characters

Marvel vs. Capcom: Clash of Super Heroes features a roster of 15 playable fighters. Unlike Marvel Super Heroes vs. Street Fighter, which limited itself to characters from the Street Fighter  series, Clash of Super Heroes uses characters from other Capcom video game franchises, such as Darkstalkers, Mega Man, and Strider. The game features 20 unplayable guest characters, drawn from the Marvel and Capcom universes, which are used for support during battle.

Guest characters from Marvel Comics include Colossus, Cyclops, Iceman, Jubilee, Juggernaut, Magneto, Psylocke, Rogue, Sentinel, Storm, Thor, and U.S. Agent, while the Capcom side includes Arthur from Ghosts 'n Goblins, Anita from Darkstalkers, Charlie as Shadow from Street Fighter, Devilotte from Cyberbots: Full Metal Madness, Lou from Three Wonders, Michelle Heart from Legendary Wings, Pure & Fur from Adventure Quiz: Capcom World 2, Ton Pooh from Strider, the Unknown Soldier from Forgotten Worlds, and Saki Omokane from Quiz Nanairo Dreams. The roster also contains six secret characters, which are accessed by inputting codes on the character select screen. Most of the secret characters are palette swaps of existing fighters with different moveset properties, such as Shadow Lady, a modified version of Chun-Li. The sole exception to this trend is Roll from the Mega Man series, who has unique sprites, but mostly shares the same moves as Mega Man.

Development and release
Marvel vs. Capcom: Clash of Super Heroes was originally developed for the CP System II arcade system board. A direct Dreamcast port was revealed by the Computer Entertainment Software Association at the 1998 Tokyo Game Show. The Dreamcast version added the new game mode, Cross Fever, which permitted four-player gameplay. The game later received a PlayStation port. However, the console's RAM limitations required the developer to remove certain features, most notably the game's tag team element; thus, most game modes were restricted to two-character battles, instead of four. This reduced the player's secondary character to an assist role, similar to guest characters. To overcome the limitations, the PlayStation version had to implement a new gameplay mode called Cross Over. Cross Over Mode allows tag team play by forcing the players to fight with identical teams. For example, if Player 1 chooses Spider-Man and Player 2 chooses Ryu, then Ryu and Spider-Man would automatically be selected as Player 1 and Player 2's secondary characters, respectively. The game also added an art gallery, where players could view game art and ending animations. Many frames of animation were also omitted as a result of insufficient RAM, particularly in larger character sprites.

Clash of Super Heroes debuted in Japanese and North American arcades in 1998. The game was released on the Dreamcast on March 25, 1999 in Japan, and October 7 in North America. A European version for the Dreamcast, published by Virgin Interactive, was released on June 23, 2000. The game was ported to the PlayStation on November 11, 1999 in Japan, where it was renamed Marvel vs. Capcom: Clash of Super Heroes EX Edition. North America and Europe received the PlayStation version later in January 2000.

A high-definition version of the game was released, alongside Marvel Super Heroes, as part of the Marvel vs. Capcom Origins collection. Built using the arcade ROM, the compilation sought to maintain the original's gameplay experience, while adding new features such as online multiplayer, challenges, and replay saving. It was released through the PlayStation Network on September 25 in North America and October 10, 2012 in Europe. The Xbox Live Arcade version was released worldwide on September 26. Following the apparent expiration of Capcom's licensing contracts with Marvel Comics in 2013, Marvel vs. Capcom Origins was removed from online stores in December 2014.

In June 2020, Clash of Super Heroes was re-released as a home arcade cabinet by Arcade1Up, which also included Marvel Super Heroes vs. Street Fighter, X-Men vs. Street Fighter, and Marvel Super Heroes in War of the Gems.

Marketing
Toy Biz produced a line of action figures to help promote the game, which consisted of four two-packs, each of which featured one Marvel character and one Capcom character. The two-packs consisted of Captain America and Morrigan, War Machine and Mega Man, Spider-Man and Strider Hiryu and Venom and Captain Commando.

Reception

In Japan, Game Machine listed Marvel vs. Capcom: Clash of Super Heroes on their April 1, 1998 issue as being the second most-successful arcade game of the month. In the United States, the game sold an estimated 3,000 arcade units, reportedly outperforming Street Fighter III (1997) to become Capcom's most successful arcade game in the US during that period. Marvel vs. Capcom: Clash of Super Heroes received "favorable" reviews on both Dreamcast and PlayStation according to the review aggregation website GameRankings.

Upon its release on the Dreamcast, Marvel vs. Capcom: Clash of Super Heroes received positive reviews for its animation quality and fast gameplay. Game Informer lauded the game for its "seamless animation, in-your-face effects, and lightning-quick gameplay". In addition, the magazine praised the Dreamcast version for being a "flawless" translation of the original arcade version. Jeff Gerstmann of GameSpot also praised the visuals and combat, stating that it was "everything you'd expect from an over-the-top, ultra-flashy fighter". Game Revolution, on the other hand, felt that Clash of Super Heroes lacked depth. The site criticized the Dreamcast port for not adding any significantly new features from the arcade version.  In Japan, Famitsu gave it a score of 33 out of 40.

The PlayStation port received a bit more mixed reviews than its Dreamcast counterpart. Gerstmann heavily faulted the game for its removal of tag team battles. He claimed that while it had "the same moves as the original game...the shell surrounding those moves [was] completely different". Douglass C. Perry of IGN labeled the PlayStation version as "an average game", praising its gameplay and lasting appeal, while criticizing its selection of fighting styles and soundtrack. GamePro praised the developer for making the decision to remove features in order to keep the speed and graphical integrity of the game without overloading the system; however, they still recommended the Dreamcast version over it.

Sequel

A sequel to Marvel vs. Capcom: Clash of Super Heroes was announced by Capcom on December 1, 1999. The game, titled Marvel vs. Capcom 2: New Age of Heroes, was initially developed for the Sega NAOMI arcade board, marking Capcom's first attempt at a fighting game outside of the CP System II and III hardware systems. It features several significant gameplay changes from Clash of Super Heroes, such as three-on-three tag team battles, a new character assist system, and a more simplified control scheme. Marvel vs. Capcom 2'' also includes a roster of 56 playable fighters, drawing numerous character sprites from Capcom's previous Marvel-licensed fighting games. Following its release in Japanese arcades in 2000, the game received ports to the Dreamcast, PlayStation 2, PlayStation 3, Xbox, Xbox 360, and iOS devices over the course of twelve years.

References
Notes

Footnotes

External links
 Official Japan Website, Archived from the original.

1998 video games
Fighting games
2D fighting games
Arcade video games
CP System II games
Crossover fighting games
Dreamcast games
Marvel vs. Capcom
PlayStation (console) games
PlayStation Network games
Tag team videogames
Video games based on Marvel Comics
Video games developed in Japan
Video games set in Russia
Video games set in New York City
Video games scored by Masato Kouda
Virgin Interactive games
Xbox 360 Live Arcade games